The Biblioteca Civica Berio (est. 1775) of Genoa, Italy, is a public library founded by . Around 1998 it moved into the former  in the  quartiere. Among its collections is the library of Demetrio Canevari.

References

This article incorporates information from the Italian Wikipedia.

Bibliography
in English
  1977?

 

in Italian

External links

 Official site
 

Libraries in Genoa
Genoa
1775 establishments in Italy
Libraries established in 1775